Archbishop Antônio de Macedo Costa (7 Aug 1830 – 20 Mar 1891) was Archbishop of São Salvador da Bahia and previously Bishop of Pará. He had been present at the First Vatican Council as a council father.  While Bishop of Pará he had been imprisoned for his role in the Religious Issue.

References

19th-century Roman Catholic archbishops in Brazil
Religious Question
1830 births
1891 deaths
Roman Catholic archbishops of São Salvador da Bahia